The women's 10,000 metres event at the 2019 European Athletics U23 Championships was held in Gävle, Sweden, at Gavlehof Stadium Park on 12 July.

Results

References

10000
10,000 metres at the European Athletics U23 Championships